Tetrahydroxy-1,4-benzoquinone biscarbonate is a chemical compound, an oxide of carbon with formula . Its molecule consists of a 1,4-benzoquinone core with the four hydrogen atoms replaced by two carbonate groups. It can be seen as a fourfold ester of tetrahydroxy-1,4-benzoquinone and carbonic acid.

The compound was obtained by C. Nallaiah in 1984, as a tetrahydrofuran solvate.

See also
 Tetrahydroxy-1,4-benzoquinone bisoxalate
 Hexahydroxybenzene trisoxalate
 Hexahydroxybenzene triscarbonate

References

Oxocarbons
1,4-Benzoquinones
Carbonate esters
Oxygen heterocycles
Heterocyclic compounds with 3 rings